In the United States, a Class II railroad, sometimes referred to as a regional railroad, is a railroad company that is not Class I, but still has a substantial amount of traffic or trackage (and is thus not a short line). (The Class I threshold is $250 million, adjusted for inflation since 1991.). , a Class II railroad in the United States has an operating revenue greater than $39.2 million but less than $489.9 million.

Current Class II railroads
Alabama and Gulf Coast Railway (AGR)
Alaska Railroad (ARR)
Buffalo and Pittsburgh Railroad (BPRR)
Central Oregon and Pacific Railroad(CORP)
Florida East Coast Railway (FEC)
Great Lakes Central Railroad (GLC)
Indiana Rail Road (INRD)
Iowa Interstate Railroad (IAIS)
Kansas & Oklahoma Railroad (KORR)
Kyle Railroad (KYLE)
Long Island Rail Road (LI)
Missouri and Northern Arkansas Railroad (MNA)
Montana Rail Link (MRL)
Reintegration into BNSF pending Surface Transportation Board review
New York, Susquehanna and Western Railway (NYSW)
Paducah and Louisville Railway (PAL)
Providence and Worcester Railroad (PW)
Pan Am Railways (PAR)
Acquisition by CSX Transportation under review by the Surface Transportation Board
Portland and Western Railroad (PNWR)
Rapid City, Pierre and Eastern Railroad (RCPE)
Reading Blue Mountain and Northern Railroad (RBMN), commonly known as simply "Reading and Northern" 
Toledo, Peoria and Western Railway (TPW)
Wisconsin and Southern Railroad(WSOR)
Wheeling and Lake Erie Railway (WE)

Former Class II railroads

 Aberdeen and Rockfish Railroad 
Alabama Great Southern Railroad (AGS), owned by Norfolk Southern Railway
Atlanta and West Point Railroad (AWP), owned by the Atlantic Coast Line Railroad
New York, Ontario & Western (NYOW)
Lehigh & Hudson River Railway (LHR)
Lehigh & New England (LNE)
Bessemer and Lake Erie Railroad (BLE), owned by Canadian National Railway
 Bullfrog Goldfield Railroad  , incorporated by interests of the Tonopah and Goldfield Railroad , later merged with the Tonopah and Tidewater and the Las Vegas and Tonopah.
Central of Georgia Railroad (CG), owned by Norfolk Southern Railway
Central Maine and Quebec Railway (CMQ), owned by Canadian Pacific Railway
 Bangor and Aroostook Railroad (BAR)
 Chicago Central and Pacific Railroad 
 Chicago, Missouri and Western Railway 
 Carolina and Northwestern Railway 
 Central Vermont Railway (CV), owned by Canadian National Railway (CN)
Dakota, Minnesota and Eastern Railroad (DME), owned by Canadian Pacific Railway 
Duluth, Missabe and Iron Range Railway (DMIR), owned by Canadian National Railway
Detroit and Toledo Shore Line Railroad (DTS)
Elgin, Joliet and Eastern Railway (EJE), owned by Canadian National Railway
Fox Valley and Western Ltd. (FVW), owned by Canadian National Railway
Gateway Western Railway (GWWR), owned by Kansas City Southern Railway
Georgia Southern and Florida Railway (GSF), owned by Norfolk Southern Railway
 Georgia Railroad and Banking Company (GA) owned by Seaboard Coast Line Railroad (SCL)
Gulf and Mississippi Railroad (GMSR)
I&M Rail Link (IMRL)
Iowa, Chicago and Eastern Railroad (ICE), owned by Canadian Pacific Railway
 Las Vegas and Tonopah Railroad 
 Magma Arizona Railroad 
 Minarets and Western Railway 
 Monongahela Railway 
 Montreal, Maine and Atlantic Railway (MMA)
 MidSouth Rail Corporation (MSRC)
 Minneapolis, Northfield and Southern Railway 
 Oklahoma, Kansas and Texas Railroad 
 Richmond, Fredericksburg and Potomac Railroad (RFP)
 Spokane International Railroad 
 Tonopah and Goldfield Railroad 
 Tonopah and Tidewater Railroad 
Texas Mexican Railway (TM), owned by Kansas City Southern Railway
Wisconsin Central Ltd. (WC), owned by Canadian National Railway
Western Railway of Alabama (WofA) owned by the Atlantic Coast Line Railroad

References

Class II railroads
Class II railroads